Marco Alciati (born September 19, 1960) is an Italian retired professional tennis player who won a gold medal at the 1979 Mediterranean Games.

ATP Challenger Tour career finals

Doubles: 1 (0–1)

References

External links

Italian male tennis players
Living people
1960 births

Mediterranean Games gold medalists for Italy
Competitors at the 1979 Mediterranean Games
Mediterranean Games medalists in tennis
20th-century Italian people